Gornet-Cricov is a commune in Prahova County, Muntenia, Romania. It has a population of 2,621 (2007) and is composed of six villages: Coșerele, Dobrota, Gornet-Cricov, Priseaca, Țărculești and Valea Seacă.

References

Communes in Prahova County
Localities in Muntenia